Chico & the Gypsies is a French musical formation of rumba catalana, flamenco and Latin pop and rock tunes led by Jahloul Chico Bouchikhi, who was one of the founders of the Gipsy Kings. After he left the Gipsy Kings due to differences with the band, Bouchikhi formed Chico and the Gypsies in 1992.

Members
Chico & the Gypsies is made up of:
 Jahloul (Chico Gypsies) Bouchikhi - frontman, guitar
 Joseph (Jose Gypsies) Gautier - guitar, lead vocalist 2009 to 2020. Joseph Gautier aka Zuzep went solo in mid 2020.
 Christophe (Kema) Baliardo - solo guitar
 Jean (Tané) Farre - guitar
 Jean-Claude (Mounin) Vila - guitar, vocals
 Alain (Babato) Bourguet: guitar, vocals. Babato was suspended from the group around 2017 following accusations by a woman of sexual assault. He never returned to the group.
 Jean-Pierre (Rey) Cargol Baliardo (son of Hippolyte Baliardo and nephew of Manitas de Plata) - guitar, vocals. Performer (Jean-Pierre Cargol, main role : Victor) in 1969 of the film The Wild Child (L'enfant sauvage)
 New band member Kassaka joined the group around May - June 2013
Extras on stage:
 Tony Ballester: bass
 Benchaa Abbas: percussion
 Eric Lafont: drums
 Julio Font Pavon: keyboards
 Manolo Gimenez - earlier (ex) lead vocalist

Discography

Albums

Live albums

Singles

See also
 New Flamenco
 Flamenco rumba
 Chico Bouchikhi
 Gipsy Kings

References

External links
 Official Website
 
 
 Chico & The Gypsies on Last.fm
 

French Romani musical groups